Indlamu (Afrikaans: Zoeloedans) is a traditional Zulu dance from Southern Africa, synonymous with the Zulu tribe of South Africa and the Northern Ndebele tribe of Western Zimbabwe. The dance is characterised by the dancer lifting one foot over his/her head and bringing it down sharply, landing squarely on the downbeat. Typically, two dancers in warrior's pelts perform indlamu routines together, shadowing each other's moves perfectly. Historically, it was performed on numerous occasions, especially when warriors prepared for war or when a harvest was celebrated.

External Links 
 INDLAMU DANCE – SOUTH AFRICA: The Zulu War Dance. danceask.net
 A look at Indlamu, the famous Zulu war dance. face2faceafrica.com

African dances
Ritual dances
War dances
South African styles of music
Swazi culture
Zulu culture